Paseo Durango is a two-story shopping mall in the city of Victoria de Durango, capital of the state of Durango, Mexico. This opened in 2007.

Anchors

 Liverpool department store
 Suburbia department store
 Cinemex 
 Fiesta Inn Hotel

External links 
 http://www.paseodurango.com/

Shopping malls in Mexico
Shopping malls established in 2007
Buildings and structures in Durango
Tourist attractions in Durango
Durango City